Northside is a hamlet in the Canadian province of Saskatchewan.

Demographics 

References

Designated places in Saskatchewan
Organized hamlets in Saskatchewan
Paddockwood No. 520, Saskatchewan
Division No. 15, Saskatchewan